Custard Apple (Annonaceae), Breadfruit (Moraceae) and Soursop (Annonaceae) are three sculptures by Veronica Ryan that stand on Narrow Way, near St Augustine's Tower in Hackney, London. They were commissioned as a memorial to the Windrush generation of British African-Caribbean people who immigrated to the United Kingdom in the wake of World War II. 

Veronica Ryan’s Custard Apple (Annonaceae), Breadfruit (Moraceae) and Soursop (Annonaceae) is the first permanent public sculpture by a black female artist in the UK. — Create London

The works were unveiled 1 October 2021. The three sculptures represent Caribbean fruits and vegetables, in reference to the nearby Ridley Road Market.

Ryan said of the work that "Ridley Market here in Hackney remains a vibrant place of early excitement going shopping with my mother, I don’t often get along to the market now, but have been so happy to buy some lovely soursops and custard apples on recent visits" and that "Cultural visibility and representation evident in public spaces is crucial. I am very happy that my sculptures will be part of this recognition".

The works were commissioned as part of the Black History Season of Hackney London Borough Council and Create London. They stand near St Augustine's Tower and the Ridley Road Market. They received the 2022 Marsh Award for Excellence in Public Sculpture.

See also 

 National Windrush Monument – unveiled in June 2022

References

2021 sculptures
Outdoor sculptures in London
Buildings and structures in the London Borough of Hackney